The Jauaru River is a river of Pará state in north-central Brazil, a tributary of the Amazon River.

Part of the river's basin is in the Maicuru Biological Reserve.

See also
List of rivers of Pará

References

Rivers of Pará
Tributaries of the Amazon River